IFK Maryland is a professional soccer team in Baltimore, Maryland founded in 2015. The club played in the American Soccer League.

The club plays their home matches at Latrobe Park in Baltimore. 

IFK has a partnership signed with three Swedish Clubs Umeå FC and IFK Holmsund and Robertsfors IK.

References 

Association football clubs established in 2015
Soccer clubs in Baltimore
Soccer clubs in Maryland
2015 establishments in Maryland